The  was the main fighter aircraft used by the Imperial Japanese Army Air Service up until 1940. Its Allied nickname was "Nate", although it was called "Abdul" in the "China Burma India" (CBI) theater by many post war sources; Allied Intelligence had reserved that name for the nonexistent Mitsubishi Navy Type 97 fighter, expected to be the successor to the carrier-borne Type 96 (Mitsubishi A5M) with retractable landing gear and an enclosed cockpit.

Design and development

In 1935, the Imperial Japanese Army held a competition between Nakajima, Mitsubishi, and Kawasaki to design a low-wing monoplane to replace the Kawasaki Ki-10 (Army Type 95 Fighter) biplane. The new fighter was to have also a better performance than the experimental Mitsubishi Ki-18.

The results were the Nakajima Ki-27, the Kawasaki Ki-28, and the Mitsubishi Ki-33 (a modification of the Mitsubishi A5M carrier-based fighter). The Nakajima design was based on its earlier Ki-11 monoplane fighter which lost to the Ki-10 in the Type 95 Fighter competition. When the follow-up Nakajima Ki-12 proposal with a liquid-cooled engine and retractable landing gear was deemed too complex by the Japanese officials, the Ki-27 was designed by Koyama Yasushi to have an air-cooled radial engine and fixed landing gear. The aircraft had the Nakajima trademark wing with a straight leading edge and tapered trailing edge which would reappear again on the Ki-43, Ki-44, and Ki-84.

The Ki-27 made its first flight on 15 October 1936. Although it had a slower top speed and worse climb performance than its competitors, the Army chose the Nakajima design for its outstanding turning ability granted by its remarkably low wing loading. The Army ordered 10 pre-production samples (Ki-27a) for further testing, which featured an enclosed cockpit with sliding canopy and larger wings.

The type was officially accepted into service in 1937 as the Army Type 97 Fighter. In addition to Nakajima, the Ki-27 was also manufactured by Tachikawa Aircraft Company Ltd and Manshukoku Hikoki Seizo KK, with a total of 3,368 built before production ended in 1942.

Operational history

The Ki-27 was the Imperial Japanese Army Air Force's main fighter until the start of World War II. When placed into combat service over northern China in March 1938, the Ki-27 enjoyed air superiority until the introduction of the faster Soviet-built Polikarpov I-16 fighters by the Chinese.

In the 1939 Battle of Khalkhin Gol against the USSR in Mongolia, the Ki-27 faced both Polikarpov I-15 biplane and Polikarpov I-16 monoplane fighters. In the initial phase of the conflict, its performance was a match for the early model I-16s, and was considerably superior to the I-15 biplane. With better trained Ki-27 pilots, the IJAAF gained aerial superiority. The Ki-27 was armed with two 7.7 mm (.303 in) Type 89 machine guns and as with most aircraft of the period, lacked armor protection for the pilot and self-sealing or fire suppression in the fuel tanks.

Later, the Soviet Air Force received improved I-16s. The faster, more heavily armed (with twin wing-mounted 20mm ShVAK cannon) and armored I-16 now nullified the Ki-27's advantages and it could now escape from the Ki-27 in a dive. The  VVS introduced new tactics consisting of flying in large tightly knit formations, attacking with altitude and/or speed advantage and hit-and-run (high-energy) tactics much as Claire Chennault would later formulate for the 1941-era Flying Tigers (likewise to fly against Japanese forces).

Japanese losses mounted but despite this they claimed 1,340 aircraft (six times the admitted Soviet losses and three times as many as Soviet aircraft admitted to being in the theatre). Japanese losses numbered 120 (including Ki-10s) while the Russians claimed 215 vs. a peak Japanese strength of 200 fighters. (Overclaiming remained commonplace through World War Two, despite gun cameras and expert intelligence assessments.) Top scoring pilot of the incident and top scoring IJAAF pilot on the Ki-27 and overall World War II IJAAF ace was Warrant Officer Hiromichi Shinohara, who claimed 58 Soviet planes (including an IJAAF record of 11 in one day) whilst flying Ki-27s, only to be shot down himself by a number of I-16s on 27 August 1939.

The preference of Japanese fighter pilots for the Ki-27's high rate of turn caused the Army to focus excessively on manoeuvrability, a decision which later handicapped the development of faster and more heavily armed fighters. The Ki-27 served until the beginning of World War II in the Pacific, escorting bombers attacking Malaya, Singapore, Netherlands East Indies, Burma and the Philippines (where it initially fared poorly against the Brewster F2A Buffalo).

The type also saw extensive action against the American Volunteer Group in the early months of the war. Soon outclassed by the American Curtiss P-40 Warhawks, the Ki-27 was replaced in front line service by the Nakajima Ki-43, while surviving examples continued to serve as a trainer.

The Ki-27 was also exported for use with Manchukuo and Thai armed forces, seeing combat with both. In Thai service, Ki-27s reportedly damaged two North American P-51 Mustangs and shot down one Lockheed P-38 Lightning and one North American P-51 Mustang.

In the final months of the war, desperate lack of aircraft forced the Japanese to utilize all available machines and the Ki-27 and 79 were no exception.

Variants
Data from
Nakajima Army Type 97 Fighter
Long Army designation for the Ki-27

 Nakajima Type PE
 Private-venture experimental aircraft with Nakajima Ha1a engine.
 Nakajima Ki-27
 Prototype version with armament in response to IJAAF specs, two aircraft built.
 Nakajima Ki-27-Kai Prototype
 Pre-production units with armament and heavier Nakajima Ha1b engine, 10 aircraft built.
 Ki-27a
 First production version. Approximately 565 aircraft built.
 Ki-27a-Kai
 Trainer version converted from existing production. Approximately 150 aircraft converted.
 Ki-27b (Army Type 97b Fighter)
 Improved canopy, oil cooler and provision for 4 × 25 kg (55 lb) bombs or fuel tanks under the wings. A total of 1,492 built, including 50 by Tachikawa Aircraft Company Ltd.
 Ki-27b-Kai
 Trainer version converted from existing production. Approximately 225 aircraft converted.
 Nakajima Ki-27-Kai
 Experimental lightened version developed as an interim solution when Ki-43 development was delayed, top speed 475 km/h (295 mph); two aircraft built).
 Mansyū Ki-79
 Trainer version, built by Manshūkoku Hikōki Seizo KK with a 510 hp Hitachi Ha.13a-I or Ha.13a-III engine. A total of 1,329 aircraft built in four sub-versions (The single seat Ki-79a (Ha.13a-I) and Ki-79c (Ha.13a-III) and the two-seat Ki-79b (Ha.13a-I) and Ki-79d (Ha.13a-III)).
 Mansyū Army Type 2 Advanced Trainer
Long Army designation for the Mansyū Ki-79

Operators

World War II

Imperial Japanese Army Air Service
No. 2 Dokuritsu Hikō Daitai IJAAF
No. 9 Dokuritsu Hikō Chutai IJAAF
No. 10 Dokuritsu Hikō Chutai IJAAF
No. 84 Dokuritsu Hikō Chutai IJAAF
No. 102 Dokuritsu Hikō Chutai IJAAF
No. 1 Hikō Sentai IJAAF
No. 2 Hikō Sentai IJAAF
No. 4 Hikō Sentai IJAAF
No. 5 Hikō Sentai IJAAF
No. 9 Hikō Sentai IJAAF
No. 11 Hikō Sentai IJAAF
No. 13 Hikō Sentai IJAAF
No. 18 Hikō Sentai IJAAF
No. 21 Hikō Sentai IJAAF
No. 24 Hikō Sentai IJAAF
No. 26 Hikō Sentai IJAAF
No. 29 Hikō Sentai IJAAF
No. 30 Hikō Sentai IJAAF
No. 33 Hikō Sentai IJAAF
No. 48 Hikō Sentai IJAAF
No. 50 Hikō Sentai IJAAF
No. 54 Hikō Sentai IJAAF
No. 59 Hikō Sentai IJAAF
No. 63 Hikō Sentai IJAAF
No. 64 Hikō Sentai IJAAF
No. 68 Hikō Sentai IJAAF
No. 70 Hikō Sentai IJAAF
No. 77 Hikō Sentai IJAAF
No. 78 Hikō Sentai IJAAF
No. 85 Hikō Sentai IJAAF
No. 87 Hikō Sentai IJAAF
No. 101 Hikō Sentai IJAAF
No. 144 Hikō Sentai IJAAF
No. 204 Hikō Sentai IJAAF
No. 206 Hikō Sentai IJAAF
No. 244 Hikō Sentai IJAAF
No. 246 Hikō Sentai IJAAF
No. 248 Hikō Sentai IJAAF
Rikugun Koukuu Shikan Gakkō
Tokorozawa Rikugun Koku Seibi Gakkō
Akeno Rikugun Hikō Gakkō
Kumagaya Rikugun Hikō Gakkō
Tachiarai Rikugun Hikō Gakkō

Manchukuo Air Force
 Reformed Government of the Republic of China
 Scheduled aircraft never delivered due to distrust of Chinese forces

 Royal Thai Air Force
Foong Bin Khap Lai 15 (15 Fighter Squadron)
Foong Bin Khap Lai 16 (16 Fighter Squadron)

Post-War

 People's Liberation Army Air Force

 Republic of China Air Force

 In 1945, Indonesian Air Force –then Indonesian People's Security Force (IPSF) (Indonesian pro-independence guerrillas)– captured a small number of aircraft at numerous Japanese air bases, including Bugis Air Base in Malang (repatriated 18 September 1945). Most aircraft were destroyed in military conflicts between the Netherlands and the newly proclaimed-Republic of Indonesia during the Indonesian National Revolution of 1945–1949.

Surviving aircraft
Two aircraft survive today:
 One Ki-27 is preserved at the Tachiarai Peace Memorial Museum.
 One Mansyu Ki-79 is preserved at the Satria Mandala Armed Forces Museum, Jakarta, Indonesia.

Specifications (Ki-27b)

See also

References

Notes

Bibliography
 Bueschel, Richard M. Nakajima Ki.27A-B Manshu Ki.79A-B in Japanese Army Air Force-Manchoukuo-IPSF-RACAF-PLAAF & CAF Service. Reading, Berkshire, UK: Osprey Publications, 1970. .
 Francillon, Ph.D., René J. Japanese Aircraft of the Pacific War. London: Putnam & Company, Second edition 1979, First edition 1970. .
 Green, William. Warplanes of the Second World War, Volume Three: Fighters. London: Macdonald & Co. (Publishers) Ltd., Seventh impression 1973, First edition 1961. .
 Green, William and Gordon Swanborough. "The Agile Asian... Japan's Type 97 Fighter". Air Enthusiast Six March–June 1978.

 Green, William and Gordon Swanborough. WW2 Aircraft Fact Files: Japanese Army Fighters, part 2. London: Macdonald and Janes's, 1977. .
 Januszewski, Tadeusz. Mitsubishi A5M Claude. Sandomierz, Poland/Redbourn, UK: Mushroom Model Publications, 2003. .
 Kotelnikov, Vladimir R.  Air War Over Khalkhin Gol: The Nomonhan Incident. Bedford, UK: SAM Publications, 2010. .
 Mikesh, Robert. Japanese Aircraft 1910–1941. Annapolis, Maryland: Naval Institute Press, 1990. .
 Nedialkov, Dimitar. In The Skies of Nomonhan, Japan vs Russia May–September 1939.. London: Crecy Publishing Limited, Second edition 2011. .
 Sakaida, Henry. Japanese Army Air Force Aces, 1937–45. Botley, Oxford, UK: Osprey Publishing, 1997. .
 Tapasanan, Vidya. "Japanese Airplanes in the Royal Thai Airforce (RTAF) Service." Asahi Journal No. 4/2002.
 Thorpe, Donald W. Japanese Army Air Force Camouflage and Markings World War II. Fallbrook, California: Aero Publishers, Inc.,1968. .
 Wieliczko, Leszek A. and Zygmunt Szeremeta. Nakajima Ki 27 Nate (bilingual Polish/English). Lublin, Poland: Kagero, 2004. .

Ki-027
Ki-27, Nakajima
Single-engined tractor aircraft
Low-wing aircraft
Ki-027, Nakajima
Aircraft first flown in 1936